Miura Hanako (born 28 March 1975) is a Japanese gymnast. She competed at the 1992 Summer Olympics and the 1996 Summer Olympics.

References

External links
 

1975 births
Living people
Japanese female artistic gymnasts
Olympic gymnasts of Japan
Gymnasts at the 1992 Summer Olympics
Gymnasts at the 1996 Summer Olympics
Sportspeople from Hiroshima
Asian Games medalists in gymnastics
Gymnasts at the 1994 Asian Games
Asian Games silver medalists for Japan
Medalists at the 1994 Asian Games
20th-century Japanese women